Marquess of Camarasa is a hereditary title in the Peerage of Spain accompanied by the dignity of Grandee, granted in 1543 by Charles II to Diego de los Cobos y Mendoza (who was son of Francisco de los Cobos y Molina) as a gift of his marriage to Francisca Luisa de Luna y Mendoza, who was Lady of Camarasa.

Marquesses of Camarasa (1543)

 Diego de los Cobos y Mendoza, 1st Marquess of Camarasa (d. 1576)
 Francisco Manuel de los Cobos y Luna, 2nd Marquess of Camarasa (d. 1616), son of the 1st Marquess
 Diego de los Cobos y Guzmán, 3rd Marquess of Camarasa (d. 1645), son of the 2nd Marquess
 Manuel de los Cobos, 4th Marquess of Camarasa (d. 1668), grandson of the 2nd Marquess
 Baltasar Manrique de Mendoza de los Cobos y Luna, 5th Marquess of Camarasa (d. 1715), son of the 4th Marquess
 Miguel Baltasar Sarmiento de los Cobos, 6th Marquess of Camarasa (d. 1733), grandson of the 4th Marquess
 María Micaela Gómez de los Cobos, 7th Marchioness of Camarasa (1701-1747), daughter of the 6th Marquess
 Leonor Gómez de los Cobos, 8th Marchioness of Camarasa (d. 1762), daughter of the 5th Marquess
 María Ignacia Sarmiento de los Cobos, 9th Marchioness of Camarasa (d. 1773), daughter of the 5th Marquess
 Baltasara de los Cobos y Luna, 10th Marchioness of Camarasa (d. 1791), daughter of the 5th Marquess
 Domingo Gayoso de los Cobos, 11th Marquess of Camarasa (1736-1803), great-grandson of the 5th Marquess
 Joaquín María Gayoso de los Cobos y Bermúdez De Castro, 12th Marquess of Camarasa (1778-1849), son of the 11th Marquess
 Francisco de Borja Gayoso Téllez-Girón de los Cobos Luna y Mendoza, 13th Marquess of Camarasa (d. 1860), son of the 12th Marquess
 Jacobo Gayoso de los Cobos y Téllez-Girón, 14th Marquess of Camarasa (1816-1871), son of the 12th Marquess
 Francisca de Borja Gayoso de los Cobos y Sevilla, 15th Marchioness of Camarasa (1854-1926), daughter of the 14th Marquess
 Ignacio Fernández de Henestrosa y Gayoso de los Cobos, 16th Marquess of Camarasa (1880-1948), son of the 15th Marchioness
 Victoria Eugenia Fernández de Córdoba y Fernández de Henestrosa, 17th Marchioness of Camarasa (1917-2013), great-granddaughter of the 15th Marchioness
 Victoria Elisabeth Hohenlohe-Langenburg y Schmidt-Polex, 18th Marchioness of Camarasa (b. 1997), great-granddaughter of the 17th Marchioness

See also
List of current Grandees of Spain

References

Grandees of Spain
Marquesses of Spain
Lists of Spanish nobility
Noble titles created in 1543